Dr. Fernando José de França Dias Van-Dúnem (born 24 August 1934) is an Angolan political figure who was the First Vice-President of the African Union's Pan-African Parliament. He is a member of the ruling Popular Movement for the Liberation of Angola (MPLA) and served as Prime Minister of Angola twice during the 1990s.

He was Prime Minister from June 1991 until December 1992 and was the first Prime Minister appointed since the post was abolished in 1978.  After four years out of office, Dias was reappointed as Prime Minister on June 3, 1996 and remained in office until a cabinet reshuffle in January 1999, when the post of Prime Minister was again eliminated.

Education
He received a Master's Degree in Public Law, and a Ph.D. in Public Law, both in Aix-en-Provence, France.

Early work
From 1964 to 1965 was a research assistant for Professor Maarten Bos regarding international law at the University of Utrecht in the Netherlands In that same year he conducted a study on Recognition of States and Government. Ambassador Van-Dúnem has been a member of the American Society of International Law since 1964. For three years starting in 1969 to 1971 he was a lecturer on Public International Law, Constitutional Law and Administrative Law in Bujumbura, Burundi.

International work
For two years starting in 1970 he was Deputy Legal Advisor to the Organisation of African Unity. From 1972 to 1978 he was Chief Personnel Officer of the same organization. For one year starting in 1978 Ambassador Van-Dúnem was OAU Deputy Representative for Political and Legal Affairs near the United Nations in Geneva, Switzerland.

From 1979 to 1982 he was Extraordinary and Plenipotentiary Ambassador of the People's Republic of Angola to Belgium, the Netherlands and the European Economic Community. For four years starting in 1982 he was Extraordinary and Plenipotentiary Ambassador of the People's Republic of Angola to Portugal and Spain.

National service
From 1985 to 1986, Van-Dúnem was Deputy Minister of External Relations, and from 1986 to 1990 he was Minister of Justice. He was Minister of Planning from 1990 to 1991, then Prime Minister from 1991 to 1992. After serving as President of the National Assembly of Angola from 1992 to 1996, he was Prime Minister for a second time from 1996 to 1999.

Van-Dúnem was a member of the National Assembly of Angola in 1999. At the same time, he was a Professor of International Law, History of Political Thought, and a member of the Faculty of Law at Catholic University of Angola.

Van-Dúnem was the 71st candidate on the MPLA's national list in the September 2008 parliamentary election. Van-Dúnem won a seat in this election, in which MPLA won an overwhelming majority.

See also
 List of members of the Pan-African Parliament
 List of ambassadors to Belgium

References

1934 births
Living people
Members of the National Assembly (Angola)
Presidents of the National Assembly (Angola)
Members of the Pan-African Parliament from Angola
Prime Ministers of Angola
Ambassadors of Angola to the Netherlands
Ambassadors of Angola to Belgium
Ambassadors of Angola to Portugal
Ambassadors of Angola to Spain
Ambassadors of Angola to the European Union
MPLA politicians